Bunbartha is a small town in Victoria, Australia. It is located in the City of Greater Shepparton.

Bunbartha Football Club

Bunbartha FC played in the Goulburn Valley Football Association in 1910 and 1911 and between 1919 and 1921.

References

Towns in Victoria (Australia)
City of Greater Shepparton